Dhadkan is a 2000 Indian Hindi-language romantic drama film directed by Dharmesh Darshan and produced by Ratan Jain. It stars Akshay Kumar, Shilpa Shetty, Suniel Shetty and Mahima Chaudhry. Being inspired by the novel Wuthering Heights, it also features Parmeet Sethi, Kiran Kumar, Sushma Seth and Manjeet Kullar in supporting roles. The story follows, Anjali and Dev are in love with each other and plan to marry, but her family gets her married to Ram. Years later, Dev shows up to reunite with Anjali, however, she has fallen in love with Ram. The music was composed by Nadeem–Shravan.

Dhadkan was delayed for almost 4 years for certain reasons. It finally released on August 11, 2000 during the Independence Day weekend and garnered generally positive reviews. It emerged as a commercial success grossing ₹26 crore worldwide. The music album was the second best-selling album of the year after Mohabbatein.

At Filmfare Awards, It was nominated in eight category, including Best Film, Best Director, Best Supporting Actress and Best Music Director, won two for Best Villain to Suniel Shetty and Best Female Playback Singer to Alka Yagnik.

Plot

3 Years Ago
Anjali is the young and beautiful daughter of her rich and influential father Narendra who is a renowned businessman. Anjali is dating the poor Dev Chopra , who cannot even afford to clothe himself properly but loves her fiercely. When Anjali asks her father for Dev's hand in marriage, he skeptically and unwillingly decides to meet Dev. After meeting him, Narendra doesn't like his extremely arrogant and outlandish attitude and rejects him and kicks him out of his house.

Anjali unwillingly leaves Dev to keep her parents happy. Heartbroken, Dev relates this to his mother, Jhanvi who instantly dies in shock as she liked Anjali a lot. Anjali marries Ram, whom Narendra believes will be the perfect match for her. Ram is a charming man of great ideals, who believes in giving a rightful place to Anjali and respects her boundaries and sensibilities and gives her ample space to cope with her loss.

After seeing the magnanimity of Ram Verma heart in accepting her, Anjali realizes she has fallen in love with him. They confess their deep love for each other. The two often go on holidays somewhere and spend romantic moments together.

Present day

Ram and Anjali celebrate their 3rd wedding anniversary. Dev returns and is now a wealthy businessman. Anjali is stuck at a crossroad on where she would stand — for Ram or Dev. She stands for Ram (whom she deeply loves) and refuses to return to Dev (who still wants to unite with her), even though it pains her to know how hurt Dev is and will be in his future.

Dev cannot stand rejection for a second time and sets out to ruin Ram's life. Anjali gets pregnant with Ram's child and tell dev about it and begs Dev to leave her alone. Dev is heart broken again and starts to cry but Ram comes with Anjali and persuades Dev. All of a sudden Dev turns good and decides to leave Anjali and Ram in their happy matrimonial life and return to London and marry his business partner Sheetal, his new companion who has secretly loved him for a long time. He departs with her to London as Anjali and Ram look on.

Cast
Shilpa Shetty as Anjali Chauhan Verma
Akshay Kumar as Ram Verma
Suniel Shetty as Dev Chopra
Mahima Chaudhry as Sheetal Verma
Sushma Seth as Vibha Verma
Parmeet Sethi as Bobby "Bob" Verma
Manjeet Kullar as Nikki Verma
Navneet Nishan as Nikki Verma in the song "Dulhe Ka Sehra"
Kiran Kumar as Narendra Chauhan
Anjana Mumtaz as Veena Chauhan
Neeraj Vora as Babban Miyan
Sharmila Tagore as Jhanvi Chopra
Anupam Kher as Digvijay Varma
Kader Khan as Pandit Hariharan in the song "Dulhe Ka Sehra"

Music

The music of the album has been composed by duo Nadeem–Shravan in the span of three years. "Dulhe Ka Sehra" sung by Nusrat Fateh Ali Khan was composed in 1997. The other songs were also recorded in 1997–98, with the exception of "Tum Dil Ki Dhadkan Mein", which was recorded in 2000 at London. "Dil Ne Yeh Kaha Hai Dil Se" and "Tum Dil Ki Dhadkan Mein" became legendary love tracks and "Dulhe Ka Sehra" a popular wedding song till date. The other successful songs are "Aksar Is Duniya Mein" and "Na Na Karte Pyaar". The album was listed at second position in the yearly music charts. According to the Indian trade website Box Office India, around 4.5 million units  were sold making it the second highest-selling album of the year after Mohabbatein.

Reception
Taran Adarsh wrote of the film:

Adarsh described Shilpa Shetty as the "life of the enterprise", adding that she "looks good, delivers her lines effectively and emotes with utmost conviction."He said Sunil Shetty's performance is one of his best, especially the scenes between Sunil and Shilpa are fabulous." He also remarked "Akshay Kumar shows vast improvement as an actor. He is very controlled and handles this difficult role with sincerity."

Padmaraj Nair of Screen felt the film had a "nostalgic feel to it, what with the effect of watching social drama from the good ol' 60s." He added that the film was "fairly interesting in the first half, with its slick screenplay, But the director does seem to lose his grip towards the end, as the film climaxes rather tamely. It seems as if he developed cold feet as far as justifying the grey role of Sunil Shetty is concerned, and ends up portraying him on a positive note." He felt, performance-wise, Shetty "scores over the rest", while adding, "Shilpa gets the best role of her career and doesn't disappoint. Akshay Kumar, in the role of the cool-headed husband, is impressive." On other departments of the film, he concluded writing, "Nadeem-Shravan's music is the very lifeline of the film, and all the tracks are melodious and situational. Cinematography by W. B. Rao is outstanding."

Awards

 46th Filmfare Awards:

Won

 Best Villain – Suniel Shetty 
 Best Female Playback Singer – Alka Yagnik for "Dil Ne Yeh Kaha Hai Dil Se"

Nominated

 Best Film – Ratan Jain
 Best Director – Dharmesh Darshan
 Best Supporting Actress – Mahima Chaudhry
 Best Music Director – Nadeem–Shravan
 Best Lyricist – Sameer for "Tum Dil Ki Dhadkan Main"
 Best Male Playback Singer – Udit Narayan for "Dil Ne Yeh Kaha Hai Dil Se"
2nd IIFA Awards:

Nominated

 Best Film – Ratan Jain
 Best Director – Dharmesh Darshan
 Best Actor – Akshay Kumar
 Best Actress – Shilpa Shetty
 Best Supporting Actress – Mahima Chaudhry
 Best Villain – Suniel Shetty
 Best Music Director – Nadeem–Shravan
 Best Lyricist – Sameer for "Tum Dil Ki Dhadkan Main"
 Best Male Playback Singer – Abhijeet for "Tum Dil Ki Dhadkan Main"
 Best Female Playback Singer – Alka Yagnik for "Dil Ne Yeh Kaha Hai Dil Se"
 Best Story – Dharmesh Darshan

Screen Awards

Won

Nominated

Box office 
The film was released on 11 August 2000 at 250 screens.
Dhadkan had a worldwide theatrical release on August 11, 2000 during the Independence Day weekend and garnered predominantly positive reviews. It emerged as a commercial success grossing 26 crore in global markets.The film’s music, composed by Nadeem - Shravan, went on to break records.

Remake
This film was unofficially remade in Bangladesh in 2001, titled as Hridoyer Bandhon.

References

External links

2000 films
2000s Hindi-language films
Films scored by Nadeem–Shravan
Films scored by Surinder Sodhi
Indian romantic drama films
Hindi films remade in other languages
Films directed by Dharmesh Darshan